Way-Ar Sangngern (We-a Saeng-ngoen), also known as Joss, born 8 March 1996) is a Thai actor and model. He is known for his main role as Neo in GMMTV's 3 Will Be Free (2019). His recent work includes Friend Zone 2: Dangerous Area and Nabi, My Stepdarling.

Early life and education 
Way-Ar was born in Thung Song District, Nakhon Si Thammarat Province, Thailand. At age 12, he attended Sarasas Witaed Saimai School and attended Traill International School at age 15. He graduated with a bachelor's degree from the Faculty of Communication Arts at Chulalongkorn University.

Filmography

Television

References

External links 
 
 
 

1996 births
Living people
Way-Ar Sangngern
Way-Ar Sangngern
Way-Ar Sangngern
Way-Ar Sangngern
Way-Ar Sangngern
Way-Ar Sangngern